4000 Hipparchus  is a dark background asteroid from the central regions of the asteroid belt, approximately  in diameter. It was discovered on 4 January 1989, by Japanese astronomers Seiji Ueda and Hiroshi Kaneda at the Kushiro Observatory on Hokkaido, Japan. The likely carbonaceous asteroid has a short rotation period of 3.4 hours. It was named for the ancient Greek astronomer Hipparchus.

Orbit and classification 

Hipparchus is a non-family asteroid from the main belt's background population (according to Nesvorný). Conversely, an alternative application of the hierarchical clustering method found it to be a core member of the Astraea family (according to Milani and Knežević). It orbits the Sun in the central asteroid belt at a distance of 2.3–2.9 AU once every 4 years and 2 months (1,523 days; semi-major axis of 2.59 AU). Its orbit has an eccentricity of 0.11 and an inclination of 3° with respect to the ecliptic. The body's observation arc begins with a precovery taken at the Palomar Observatory in November 1954, or more than 34 years prior to its official discovery observation at Kushiro .

Naming 

This minor planet was named by IAU's Working Group for Planetary System Nomenclature after the Greek astronomer Hipparchus ( BC), considered to be the greatest astronomer of ancient times. Hipparchus introduced a systematic and critical approach to both theoretical and observational astronomy. He is also honored by a lunar and a Martian crater (Hipparchus and Hipparchus, respectively). The official naming citation was published by the Minor Planet Center on 21 November 1991. The asteroid is one of several early "kilo-numbered" minor planets that were dedicated to renowned scientists or institutions including:
 1000 Piazzia named for Giuseppe Piazzi, discoverer of Ceres
 2000 Herschel for William Herschel who discovered Uranus
 3000 Leonardo for the Italian polymath of the Renaissance, Leonardo da Vinci

Physical characteristics 

Based on its low albedo of around 0.04–0.05 (see below), Hipparchus is likely of a carbonaceous rather than siliceous composition, among which the C-type asteroid are the most common ones in the asteroid belt.

Rotation period 

In February 2014, a rotational lightcurve of Hipparchus was obtained from photometric observations by astronomers at the Phillips Academy  and HUT  observatories. Lightcurve analysis gave a rotation period of  hours with a brightness amplitude of 0.11 magnitude. A previous observation at the Palomar Transient Factory from August 2012, only gave a fragmentary lightcurve with a longer period of 7.935 hours.

Diameter and albedo 

According to the surveys carried out by the Japanese Akari satellite and the NEOWISE mission of NASA's Wide-field Infrared Survey Explorer, Hipparchus measures between 15.13 and 18.87 kilometers in diameter and its surface has a low albedo between 0.039 and 0.052. The Collaborative Asteroid Lightcurve Link assumes a standard albedo for a stony asteroid (rather than for a carbonaceous one) and consequently and calculates a smaller diameter of 8.18 kilometers based on an absolute magnitude of 12.8.

References

External links 
 Asteroid 4000 Hipparchus, Small Bodies Data Ferret
 Asteroid Lightcurve Database (LCDB), query form (info )
 Dictionary of Minor Planet Names, Google books
 Discovery Circumstances: Numbered Minor Planets (1)-(5000) – Minor Planet Center
 
 

004000
Discoveries by Seiji Ueda
Discoveries by Hiroshi Kaneda
Named minor planets
19890104